The 1980–81 Washington Huskies men's basketball team represented the University of Washington for the 1980–81 NCAA Division I men's basketball season. Led by tenth-year head coach Marv Harshman, the Huskies were members of the Pacific-10 Conference and played their home games on campus at Hec Edmundson Pavilion in Seattle, Washington.

There was no conference tournament yet; it debuted six years later.

References

External links
Sports Reference – Washington Huskies: 1980–81 basketball season

Washington Huskies men's basketball seasons
Washington Huskies
Washington
Washington